Billy Brit is a puppet character who has been used in YouTube videos by the youth wing of the British National Party.

In one of the videos, titled "Heroes", the character recites a poem extolling a series of British figures: Boudicca, Edward I, William Shakespeare, Isaac Newton, Lord Nelson, the Duke of Wellington, Captain Scott, Enoch Powell and Nick Griffin. Every verse except for the one on Griffin ends with a statement that the individual was white.

The "Heroes" video was criticised by Hari Kunzru of The Guardian. An episode of Have I Got News for You played a clip containing the Boudicca verse, prompting Stuart Maconie to jokingly comment "Pixar have gone really downhill, haven't they?".

The puppet itself was not commissioned by the BNP but was, in fact, a standard puppet bought off-the-shelf.

References

Puppets
History of the British National Party